Primary cell culture is the ex vivo culture of cells freshly obtained from a multicellular organism, as opposed to the culture of immortalized cell lines. In general, primary cell cultures are considered more representative of in vivo tissues than cell lines, and this is recognized legally in some countries such as the UK (Human Tissue Act 2004). However, primary cells require adequate substrate and nutrient conditions to thrive and after a certain number of divisions they acquire a senescent phenotype, leading to irreversible cell cycle arrest. The generation of cell lines stems from these two reasons. Primary cells can become immortalized either spontaneously (e.g. HeLa cells) or by genetic modification (e.g. HEK cells), at which point they become cell lines which can be subcultured indefinitely.

Because of their requirements for viability, primary cell cultures did not become widespread until the 2000s. These cultures present several advantages over cell lines, including a better representation of the cellular heterogeneity of tissues, a more faithful transcriptomic and proteomic profile (especially when cultured in 3D) and more realistic functional responses, including drug responses. In contrast, immortalized cell lines are known to become homogeneous through the natural selection of specific subpopulations, to undergo genetic drift and to acquire genetic aberrations. In many cases, cell lines have been misidentified, contaminated with other cells or infected with Mycoplasma, small intracellular bacteria that went undetected for decades.

When whole or partial tissues are isolated and maintained ex vivo, the procedure is termed primary tissue culture. More specific terms include organotypic culture, tissue slices and explants.

Neuronal primary cell cultures are cells collected from the brain of an organism. For example they can be used when examining substances effect on cell viability, which can further on be potential treatments for brain deficits.

See also 
3D cell culture
Induced pluripotent stem cell
Patient-derived xenograft

References 

Cell culture